Agonomalus jordani is a fish in the family Agonidae. It was described by David Starr Jordan and Edwin Chapin Starks in 1904.

It is a marine, temperate water-dwelling fish which is known from the northwestern Pacific Ocean, including Japan, the Sea of Japan, and Sakhalin.

References

jordani
Fish of Japan
Taxa named by David Starr Jordan
Taxa named by Edwin Chapin Starks
Fish described in 1904